Scott McMullen (born November 18, 1980) is a former American football quarterback who played one season with the Columbus Destroyers of the Arena Football League. He played college football at Ohio State University. He was also a member of the Philadelphia Eagles of the National Football League. Currently playing social men’s recreational softball for Gregory Electric.

Professional career
McMullen was signed by the Philadelphia Eagles on April 27, 2004. He was released by the team on June 1, 2004.

McMullen signed with the Columbus Destroyers on October 22, 2004.

References

External links
Just Sports Stats
College stats
Columbus Parks and Recreation

Living people
1980 births
Players of American football from Ohio
American football quarterbacks
Ohio State Buckeyes football players
Columbus Destroyers players
People from Granville, Ohio